Boden (outdatedly ) is a locality and the seat of Boden Municipality in Norrbotten County, Sweden with 16,847 inhabitants in 2018. After Kiruna, it is the second largest town in Northern Sweden's interior.

History 
The town of Boden started as a railway junction where the Northern Line (Norra stambanan, opened 1894) met with the Ore Line (Malmbanan) from the rich iron ore fields in northern Sweden.

The town experienced increased growth when the Boden Fortress was constructed in the beginning of the 20th century. The purpose of the fortress was to defend Sweden from a possible attack from the east, where Russia was considered the most dangerous threat.

The first official writings about Boden, was in a 1500~ tax paper, where the mention of "Boden village" with 7 homes.
Boden got the title of city in 1919. This title became obsolete in 1971 and Boden is now the seat of Boden Municipality.

Industry 
Today (2007) Boden is still a military stronghold, and houses the largest garrison of the Swedish Army.

The army and the municipality are the two largest employers in Boden. As the military is continuously disarming, with the five regiments united into one garrison, the population has decreased by 2,000 people over the past ten years.

The Swedish Company H2 green steel is currently erecting a new steel mill in Boden which is expected to start production in 2025. It is supposed to use hydrogen technology, designed to cut emissions by as much as 95%. If it succeeds, it will be the first large-scale green steel plant in Europe.

The famous Fällkniven knives are from Boden.

Well-known Boden citizens, former or current 
 Peter Englund, author, historian, Permanent secretary of the Swedish Academy (2009-2015)
 Karl Fabricius, ice hockey player
 Stefan Gunnarsson, singer, piano player
 Eyvind Johnson, author, Nobel Prize winner in literature 1974
 Lennart Klockare, politician
 Daniel Larsson, ice hockey player
 Johanna Larsson, tennis player
 Elias Lindholm, ice hockey player
 Jonna Löfgren, drummer with Glasvegas
 Stig Strömholm, professor, rector magnificus
 Oskar Sundqvist, ice hockey player
 Stig Sundqvist, football player
 Stig Synnergren, former Swedish Supreme Commander
 Sven Utterström, skier
 Niclas Wallin, ice hockey player
 Hans Wallmark, politician
 Brolle, singer
 Tommy Johansson, singer, guitarist of the bands Majestica (formerly ReinXeed) and Sabaton
 Tejbz, video game commentator and streamer
 Jessica Bäckman, racing driver

International relations

Twin towns and sister cities
Boden is twinned with:
 Alta, Norway
 Hakkari, Turkey

Sports
The following sports clubs are located in Boden:

 Bodens BK
 Hedens IF
 Skogså IF 
 Vittjärvs IK
 Bodens HF
 Boden Handboll IF

References 

 
Populated places in Boden Municipality
Norrbotten
Municipal seats of Norrbotten County
Swedish municipal seats

fi:Bodenin kunta